was a town located in Ogi District, Saga Prefecture, Japan. The status of Mikatsuki was changed from a village to a town on January 1, 1969.

As of 2003, the town had an estimated population of 11,675 and a density of 568.68 persons per km2. Its total area was 20.53 km2.

On March 1, 2005, Mikatsuki, along with the towns of Ogi (former), Ashikari and Ushizu (all from Ogi District), was merged to create the city of Ogi.

Dissolved municipalities of Saga Prefecture